McIlwaine House, also known as the Jones-McIlwaine House, is a historic home located at Petersburg, Virginia. It was built in 1815, and is a -story, Federal style frame dwelling with a -story wing. It has a front porch with a modillioned cornice supported by Doric order columns.  The house was moved eight blocks to its present location in 1972.

It was listed on the National Register of Historic Places in 1973.

References

Houses on the National Register of Historic Places in Virginia
Federal architecture in Virginia
Houses completed in 1815
Houses in Petersburg, Virginia
National Register of Historic Places in Petersburg, Virginia